Pythonaster is a genus of deep-sea velatid sea stars containing three species.

Taxonomy
List of species according to World Register of Marine Species:
 Pythonaster atlantidis A.H. Clark, 1948
 Pythonaster murrayi Sladen, 1889
 Pythonaster pacificus Downey, 1979

References

Velatida